Mahnar ( in Hindi : महनार ) is a block in vaishali district, bihar state, According to census website all blocks in  bihar state  Nomenclature as C.D.Block ( community development blocks.

villages

Number of Panchayat : 14
Number of Villages : 50
number of wards 40

Population and communities
Male Population : 74214  (2009 ist.)
female Population : 69826
Total Population : 144040
SC Total Population : 31416
ST Total Population : 12
Minority Total Population : 10629 
Population Density : 1441
Sex Ratio : 941

Politics
It is part of the Mahnar Assembly constituency.

public distribution system
Nos of HHs : 22567
BPL Card Holders : 23798
Antodaya Card Holders : 5281 
Annapurna Card Holders : 200
APL : 14998
Nos of Fair Price Shops: 110

Education
literacy rate : 52.2%(2001 ist.)
male literacy rate : 65%
Female literacy rate : 38.6%

School
Primary School : 71 (2009 ist.)
Upper Primary School : 63

Banking
Number of Banks: State bank of India, Bandhan Bank Limited, central Bank of India, bank of india, idbi bank, canara bank, Punjab national bank, vijay uttar bihar gramin bank Bank of Baroda

References 

Community development blocks in Vaishali district